Róbert Waltner (born 20 September 1977) is a Hungarian football coach and a former player.

Playing career
Waltner was a forward during his playing career, and is most remembered for representing Zalaegerszeg during three different spells and is the club's all-time top scorer with 92 league goals.

He was part of the Zalaegerszeg side that won the club's first league title in the 2001–02 season, under manager Péter Bozsik. In the third qualifying round of the 2002–03 UEFA Champions League, Waltner was part of the Zalaegerszeg squad that faced English giants Manchester United. In the first leg, ZTE provided a stunning shock by winning 1–0 with a last minute goal from Béla Koplárovics.

Coaching career
Waltner resigned as a head coach of Zalaegerszeg on 25 March 2022.

On 26 May 2022, he was appointed as the coach of Paks. On 13 February 2023, he was sacked from Paks.

Honours
Zalaegerszegi
Nemzeti Bajnokság I: 2001–02
Szuperkupa runner-up: 2002

Boca Juniors
Copa Libertadores: 2003
Intercontinental Cup: 2003

Individual
Nemzeti Bajnokság I Top Scorer: 2007–08

References

External links
 Profile

1977 births
Living people
People from Kaposvár
Hungarian footballers
Association football forwards
Hungary international footballers
Hungary under-21 international footballers
Kaposvári Rákóczi FC players
Fehérvár FC players
Újpest FC players
Zalaegerszegi TE players
Boca Juniors footballers
Anorthosis Famagusta F.C. players
Vasas SC players
Al Dhafra FC players
SV Mattersburg players
BFC Siófok players
Lombard-Pápa TFC footballers
Nemzeti Bajnokság I players
Austrian Football Bundesliga players
Cypriot First Division players
Hungarian expatriate footballers
Expatriate footballers in Argentina
Expatriate footballers in Cyprus
Expatriate footballers in the United Arab Emirates
Expatriate footballers in Austria
Hungarian expatriate sportspeople in Argentina
Hungarian expatriate sportspeople in Cyprus
Hungarian expatriate sportspeople in the United Arab Emirates
Hungarian expatriate sportspeople in Austria
UAE Pro League players
Hungarian football managers
Zalaegerszegi TE managers
Nemzeti Bajnokság I managers
Sportspeople from Somogy County